Manuel Alfredo Mosquera Bastida (born 10 August 1968) is a Spanish retired footballer who played as a forward, and is the manager of Talavera de la Reina.

Playing career
Born in Oleiros, Galicia, Mosquera was a Deportivo de La Coruña youth graduate. After spending several seasons with the reserves in Tercera División, he made his first team debut on 26 November 1989, starting in a 1–0 Segunda División home win against Racing de Santander.

Mosquera scored his first professional goal on 2 December 1989, netting his team's second in a 3–1 away defeat of UD Las Palmas. After contributing with 20 appearances in his first season, he only featured in one match during his second, as his side achieved promotion to La Liga.

In 1991, Mosquera moved to CF Extremadura in Segunda División B, being a regular starter and achieving two promotions; in the latter one, to the first division, he scored a career-best 19 goals. On 29 October 1995, he scored a hat-trick in a 4–2 home success over Bilbao Athletic.

In June 1996, Mosquera agreed to a three-year contract with SD Compostela in the top tier. He made his debut in the category on 1 September, starting in a 0–6 loss at CD Tenerife, and scored his first goal the following 18 May in a 2–2 away draw against Real Oviedo.

In January 1998, Mosquera returned to his former side Extremadura, being an undisputed starter in the following seven-and-a-half seasons which the club achieved one promotion (to the first division in 1998) and subsequently suffered two relegations (in 1999 and 2002). In 2005 he joined CCD Cerceda in the fourth division, and represented the side for two full seasons before retiring at the age of 38.

Managerial career
On 2 April 2007, while playing for Cerceda, Mosquera replaced Ramiro Sorbet at the helm of the first team, and acted as a player-manager until the end of the season. He subsequently took over the club's youth categories and the reserves in the regional leagues.

On 1 June 2011, Mosquera was appointed manager of Laracha CF in the fifth tier, and managed to achieve promotion to the fourth level in 2013; around that time, he also worked as manager of the Association of Spanish Footballers. On 18 June 2014, he returned to his first club Deportivo, being named manager of the B-team.

On 17 June 2016, Mosquera joined Dépor's staff as an assistant sporting director. On 27 February 2019, after more than two years without coaching, he took over the renamed Extremadura UD in the second division, replacing fired Rodri. He kept the club up before the end of the season, but they suffered relegation in July 2020, after which he expressed a desire to continue in the job.

Mosquera was sacked on 22 November 2020 due to poor results, but was again appointed manager the following 5 January after a change in the club's internal structure.

Personal life
Mosquera's son, also named Manuel, is also a footballer and a forward. He too was groomed at Deportivo, and played under him at Extremadura.

Managerial statistics

References

External links

1968 births
Living people
Spanish footballers
Footballers from Galicia (Spain)
Sportspeople from the Province of A Coruña
People from A Coruña (comarca)
Association football forwards
La Liga players
Segunda División players
Segunda División B players
Tercera División players
Deportivo Fabril players
Deportivo de La Coruña players
CF Extremadura footballers
SD Compostela footballers
Spanish football managers
Segunda División managers
Primera Federación managers
Segunda División B managers
Extremadura UD managers